Baconism may refer to:
The philosophy of Francis Bacon, an English philosopher
The United Church of Bacon, a parody religion